Spring Vale railway station was a railway station that served the community of Spring Vale, in Darwen, Lancashire, England. It was opened by the Bolton, Blackburn, Clitheroe and West Yorkshire Railway on 3 August 1847, and was originally named Sough. At first, it was the southern terminus of the line from Blackburn (Bolton Road); the line south of Sough to  opened on 12 June 1848 and was just located south of the road bridge at the top off Cranberry Lane The station was moved 150 yards north and was renamed Spring Vale and Sough in November 1870, and Spring Vale on 1 March 1877. It was closed on 5 August 1958, two days after nearby .
It achieved noteworthiness when, on the night of 25 September 1931, Mahatma Gandhi alighted from a train there to spend the night with a local family whilst visiting England to see the effects of his cotton making campaign on the British textile industry.

References

Welch, S. Lancashire Steam Finale, 

Disused railway stations in Blackburn with Darwen
Darwen
Former Lancashire and Yorkshire Railway stations
Railway stations in Great Britain opened in 1847
Railway stations in Great Britain closed in 1958
1847 establishments in England